Rutheron is an unincorporated community located in Rio Arriba County, New Mexico, United States. Rutheron had its own post office from May 27, 1927, to March 1, 1997.

References

Unincorporated communities in Rio Arriba County, New Mexico
Unincorporated communities in New Mexico